Velo Vie is a Tempe, Arizona-based manufacturer and marketer of racing bicycles that sells direct to consumers through its online marketplace. It offers customizable Velo Vie bicycle frames, and offers components through manufacturer partners including SRAM, Reynolds, Easton, Speedplay, and LOOK.

Company history
Velo Vie was founded in 2006. In May 2007 Velo Vie received its first review by an independent source on the Vitesse 300. Velo Vie followed this with their first showing at Interbike. By early 2008 Velo Vie had released several new models bringing a more complete line of road bikes to their customers. To support this growth in the market Velo Vie partnered with Quality Bicycle Products and their Dream Cycle division. By early 2009 Velo Vie had moved into a new category for the company by creating the Versa: a cyclo-cross bike. Expanding on its more complete line Velo Vie added to its distribution channel by supporting IBD's. Velo Vie continued its growth in 2009 by partnering with Lifetime Fitness to offer their members access to limited edition Velo Vie bicycles.

Team and athlete involvement
By 2007 Velo Vie sponsored teams around the world, and by 2008 had sponsored its first pro continental team which included Olympic gold medal winner Miguel Martinez and many others. As well as its first women's professional team. In 2008 Velo Vie entered the triathlon community by sponsoring a professional triathlete. Its relationship with teams has not stopped there and Velo Vie continues to put money into working with teams at all levels to further the sport of cycling. Later in 2008 Velo Vie started working with Turning Point and Jenny Jones and her charity bringing into full view their exclusive exchange program and commitment to junior's racing. 2009 Amore-e-Vita and Velo Vie extended their commitment to athletes working with athlete Chad Gerlach who had been featured on the TV show Intervention.

Pictures

External links

References

Cycle manufacturers of the United States
Vehicle manufacturing companies established in 2006
2006 establishments in Arizona